Tytroca alabuensis is a moth of the family Noctuidae first described by Wiltshire in 1970. It is found in Africa, including Ethiopia, Kenya, Namibia, Somalia and Tanzania.

References 

Catocalinae
Owlet moths of Africa
Moths described in 1970